Craigery Owens (born August 26, 1984) is an American musician best known as the former lead vocalist of Chiodos. He has also had an involvement in various projects such as Cinematic Sunrise, The Sound of Animals Fighting, Isles & Glaciers, and Destroy Rebuild Until God Shows. He has recorded as a solo artist, is an established music producer, has written and recorded with the likes of Dr. Dre, and has also acted in the 2012 film K-11.

He currently performs under the stage name badXchannels.

Music career

Chiodos
 
In 2001, Owens joined Bradley Bell, Pat McManaman, Jason Hale, Matt Goddard and Derrick Frost to form a band in Davison, Michigan. Originally named "Chiodos Bros." in tribute to special effects trio the Chiodo Brothers, the band recorded its first demo in June 2002. Following several years of national touring and independent recording, they were signed by Equal Vision Records in 2004 and, under the name Chiodos, released their first full-length album, All's Well That Ends Well in 2005. They continued thereafter, recording and touring.

Even after his separation from his first band, Owens continued to have an interest in working with them and, after being asked by his management about what project he most wanted to pursue, he made overtures about a possible return to Chiodos. On April 26, 2012, Owens announced his return to Chiodos. Subsequently, on April 27, the remaining members of D.R.U.G.S. revealed their intention to disband. Chiodos' first live appearance after their reunion took place on August 9, 2012 in a sold-out performance at Flint Local 432 in Michigan. As of that date, the members had tentative plans for a new album, on which they have been working separately but not yet begun to coordinate.

On November 1, 2016 in an interview with Billboard, vocalist Craig Owens stated in regards to Chiodos that, "It's done, it just couldn't stay afloat. There were just kind of, not necessarily bad vibes, but we came to the realization that we can't do it full-time. I think it just stopped becoming a passion for most of us so we said, 'Alright, let's stop." Thus bringing an end to Chiodos' fifteen-year career. Owens is now performing under the stage moniker badXchannels and is touring in support of his new solo album "WHYDFML" (what have you done for me lately).

The Sound of Animals Fighting

Owens featured as vocalist in the supergroup, the Sound of Animals Fighting. Owens featured on the album Lover, the Lord Has Left Us.. released in 2006. The group consisted of project members of Circa Survive, Finch, Rx Bandits, Days Away each member of the group wore an animal mask to hide their personas to influence the groups creativeness, Owens is identified in the group as the Ram. Owens appeared in the groups live line up We Must Become the Change We Want to See in 2006 along with 11 other members.

Cinematic Sunrise

During this work with Chiodos, Owens and Bell formed the side project Cinematic Sunrise as a place to perform music that didn't fit Chiodos' style. When the band signed with Equal Vision, in March 2008, its line-up had included Owens, Bell, Bryan Beeler, Marcus Vankirk and Dave Shapiro. Cinematic Sunrise released an EP later that Spring, A Coloring Storybook and Long Playing Record.

Isles & Glaciers

In September 2008, Owens revealed to fans on his journal that in addition to several guest vocalist appearances, he was working on another side project with Jonny Craig of Emarosa/Dance Gavin Dance, Vic Fuentes of Pierce the Veil and Nick Martin of Cinematic Sunrise. When the Isles & Glaciers supergroup was officially announced in December, it also included Owens' bandmate Matt Goddard, Fuentes' brother and bandmate Mike Fuentes and Brian Southall from the band TREOS.

The supergroup premiered their first songs during a radio interview on January 18, 2009. The band's EP, The Hearts of Lonely People, was released on March 9, 2010.

Asked in March 2012 if Isles & Glaciers would consider further collaboration, Owens indicated that the possibility had been discussed among various members of the group but not established; "we've tossed the idea around to see if we could put it back together, but that was just to see if we could do anything...there's no set plans right now."

Destroy Rebuild Until God Shows

On September 15, 2009, Owens released a solo EP, "Με την αγάπη (With Love)", through Equal Vision Records. Nine days later, on September 24, 2009, Chiodos announced that they had parted ways with Craig Owens, announcing that the decision to "let Craig Owens go as the singer of Chiodos...was a necessary one", but refusing to disclose details "[o]ut of respect for all of the hard work that we have put in together for all of these years". For the next several months, Owens maintained a low profile, taking personal time and writing songs.

In June 2010, at the time he discussed his upcoming project with Alternative Press, he had written or co-written 30 songs for a not-yet-completed supergroup signed to Decaydance featuring Nick Martin of Cinematic Sunrise and Aaron Stern of Matchbook Romance. On August 17, Owens announced via Twitter that the new band would be named D.R.U.G.S. (Destroy Rebuild Until God Shows). On February 21, 2011, with the completed band lineup including Matt Good of From First to Last and Adam Russell of Story of the Year and production by John Feldmann, D.R.U.G.S. released their eponymous debut. The album reached No. 29 on Billboard 200 and higher on some of Billboards specialized lists, including hitting No. 6 on Top Rock Albums, No. 5 on Modern Rock/Alternative Albums and No. 1 on Hard Rock Albums. D.R.U.G.S. coheadlined the 2011 Alternative Press Tour.

Bea5t
In February 2016, Craig released a short grindcore EP entitled Empathy Is A Gift under the moniker of Bea5t, downloadable from his bandcamp page.

badXchannels
After the end of Chiodos, Craig began releasing music under the moniker badXchannels. An extended play was released at the end of 2016 with two more stand-alone songs released in early 2017. These songs were later grouped into an EP known as Transmissions, freely available to subscribers of his mailing list.

Discography

Albums

Studio albums

Featured albums

Singles

Featured appearances

References

External links

American Lutherans
American rock singers
Countertenors
Equal Vision Records artists
Living people
Singers from Michigan
1984 births
21st-century American singers
21st-century American male singers
Chiodos members
The Sound of Animals Fighting members
Isles & Glaciers members
Destroy Rebuild Until God Shows members
Cinematic Sunrise members